Ines Pohl (born 12 April 1967, in Mutlangen, Baden-Württemberg) is a German journalist.

Early life and education
Pohl grew up in rural Swabia (East Württemberg) as the daughter of a kindergarten teacher (mother) and a skilled labour  worker (father). After graduating high school (German Abitur) in Schwäbisch Gmünd, she studied German studies and Scandinavian studies at the University of Göttingen. 
In the early and mid-1980s, as a school girl and a young student, Pohl was actively involved in the German peace movement, specifically in the protest against the stationing of MGM-31 Pershing missiles at a United States Armed Forces Missile Storage Area at Mutlanger Heide ("Mutlangen heathland") near her hometown (as part of the NATO Double-Track Decision).

Career and private life 
In the 1990s, Pohl worked as a freelance journalist at a local radio station as well as for several regional newspapers; she did her traineeship at Hessische/Niedersächsische Allgemeine (HNA) newspaper. There, she was gradually promoted up the ranks, being leading editor for politics within ten years.

In 2004/2005, Pohl spent a year at Harvard University on a scholarship of the Nieman Foundation for Journalism.

In 2008, Pohl went to Berlin to work as a correspondent for the Ippen publishing house. From July 2009 until September 2015 she was editor in chief of the left-wing newspaper Die Tageszeitung,. During her time at the newspaper, her brief was to return the paper to its left-wing roots after a much-criticised foray into more popular journalism.

In 2016, Pohl joined German international broadcaster Deutsche Welle in 2015, where she worked as Washington correspondent. Soon after, she was appointed editor-in-chief, from 1 March 2017.

Pohl lives together with her spouse in Berlin.

Other activities
 Jugend gegen AIDS, Member of the Advisory Board
 International Journalists' Programmes, Member of the Board of Trustees
 Reporters Without Borders Germany, Member of the Board of Trustees (2010–2016)

Recognition
In 2009, Pohl was awarded the prize "Best journalist of the year" in the category "newcomer" by the Medium Magazine.

References

1967 births
Living people
People from Mutlangen
German women journalists
German newspaper journalists
German television journalists
Die Tageszeitung people
Deutsche Welle
German LGBT journalists
21st-century German journalists
21st-century German women